The Silicon Valley Strikers are an American professional Twenty20 franchise cricket team that compete in Minor League Cricket (MiLC). The team is based in Silicon Valley, California. It was formed in 2020 as part of 24 original teams to compete in Minor League Cricket. The franchise is owned by bInfinite, LLC.

The team's home ground is Morgan Hills Outdoor Sports Complex, located in Morgan Hill, California. Unmukt Chand was named as captain, while Pranay Suri was named as vice-captain for the team.

The current leading run-scorer is Unmukt Chand, with the highest wicket-taker being Abhishek Paradkar.

Franchise history

Background 
Talks of an American Twenty20 league started in November 2018 just before USA Cricket became the new governing body of cricket in the United States. In May 2021, USA Cricket announced they had accepted a bid by American Cricket Enterprises (ACE) for a US$1 billion investment covering the league and other investments benefitting the U.S. national teams.

In an Annual General Meeting on February 21, 2020, it was announced that USA Cricket was planning to launch Major League Cricket in 2021 and Minor League Cricket that summer, but it was delayed due to the COVID-19 pandemic and due to the lack of high-quality cricket stadiums in the USA. Major League Cricket was pushed to a summer-2023 launch and Minor League Cricket was pushed back to July 31, 2021.

USA Cricket CEO Iain Higgins also pointed out cities such as New York City, Houston and Los Angeles with a large cricket fanbase, and targeted them among others as launch cities for Minor League Cricket.

Exhibition league 
In July 2020, the player registration for the Minor League Cricket exhibition league began. On August 15, 2020, USA Cricket announced the teams participating in the exhibition league matches, also listing the owners for each team. The draft for the exhibition league began on August 22, 2020, with the Silicon Valley Strikers releasing their squad on August 24. Shadley van Schalkwyk was later named as captain for the Silicon Valley Strikers in the exhibition league.

2021 season 

After the conclusion of the exhibition league, USA Cricket announced that they were planning to launch the inaugural season of Minor League Cricket in spring 2021. Ahead of the official season, which was announced to kick off on July 31, they announced Unmukt Chand as captain and Pranay Suri as vice-captain (although originally Suri was captain, due to Chand not being called in the squad until the third week).

In their first match of the season, the Strikers defeated the Thunderbolts by 2 wickets. They then went on to win against the Master Blasters, the Surf Riders twice, the Blazers twice, the Lashings, the Grizzlies twice, and the Thunderbolts again. They additionally lost against the Lashings, the Master Blasters, and the Thunderbolts throughout the group stage. They placed 2nd in their group, thus qualifying the Strikers for the quarter-finals.

In the quarter-finals, the Strikers won against the Austin Athletics in a best-of-3 series 2-1, qualifying them for the semi-finals. During the semi-finals, the Strikers bowled out the Grizzlies for 135 to win by 33 runs and take them to the finals. In the finals, they won against the Stallions by 6 wickets to win their maiden MiLC title.

2022 season 
Ahead of the 2022 season, Major League Cricket announced that the draft for that season would take place on May 12.

Current squad 
 Players with international caps are listed in bold.
  denotes a player who is currently unavailable for selection.
  denotes a player who is unavailable for rest of the season

Statistics

Most runs 

Source: CricClubs, Last updated: 17 December 2021

Most wickets 

Source: CricClubs, Last updated: 19 December 2021

See also 
 2021 Minor League Cricket season
 Minor League Cricket
 Major League Cricket
 Seattle Thunderbolts
 Houston Hurricanes

References 

Minor League Cricket teams
Cricket teams in the San Francisco Bay Area
Cricket clubs established in 2020
2020 establishments in California